This is a list of rivers of Central America and the Caribbean by country.

Central American rivers by country

Belize

Costa Rica

El Salvador

Lempa River

Guatemala

Motagua River
Usumacinta River

Honduras

Patuca River
Ulua River
Chamelecón River
Aguán River
Humuya River
Choluteca River
Leán River
Coco River
Blanco River
Lempa River
Motagua River

Mexico

Nicaragua

Coco River
Escondido River
Grande de Matagalpa River
San Juan River

Panama

Tuira River
Chucunaque River
Chagres River
Chepo River
La Villa River
Chiriquí Viejo River

Caribbean rivers by country
The Dutch Caribbean (including Aruba) and all other unlisted territories have only streams or creeks due to their small island size. The Bahamas only has one river, the Goose River, in Central Andros and many creeks.

Barbados

Cuba

Dominica

Dominican Republic

Grenada

Guadeloupe

Haiti

Jamaica

Puerto Rico

Saint Kitts and Nevis

Saint Lucia

Saint Vincent and the Grenadines

Trinidad and Tobago

United States Virgin Islands

Rivers
Rivers 
Central America

 
 
Central America and the Caribbean